The Williamson Red Birds were a Mountain State League baseball team based in Williamson, West Virginia, United States that played from 1939 to 1942. They were affiliated with the St. Louis Cardinals.

They made the playoffs every year they existed, winning the league championship in 1940, under Harrison Wickel.

The team was previously named the Williamson Colts from 1937 to 1938. The Class-D team was managed by Nat Hickey in both years of its existence. Under his leadership, the team made the playoffs both seasons, finishing third both years, but it did not win a league championship either time.

Walter Sessi and, most notably, baseball Hall of Famer Stan Musial played for the team.

Notable alumni

Baseball Hall of Fame Alumni

 Stan Musial (1938-1939)

MLB alumni

 Ken Holcombe (1939)

 Del Rice (1941-1942) MLB All-Star

Hal Rice (1941-1942)

 Walter Sessi (1937, 1939) Inducted, 1969

References

External links
Baseball Reference

Baseball teams established in 1937
Baseball teams disestablished in 1942
St. Louis Cardinals minor league affiliates
Mountain State League teams
Defunct minor league baseball teams
Professional baseball teams in West Virginia
1937 establishments in West Virginia
1942 disestablishments in West Virginia
Mingo County, West Virginia
Defunct baseball teams in West Virginia